John Crommelin may refer to:

 John G. Crommelin (1902–1996), American admiral and political candidate
 John Crommelin-Brown (1888–1953), British cricketer